A bothy band is a musical group which comes from the farming culture of nineteenth century Scotland. At that time agriculture was relatively labour-intensive. As a result, large farms often had a small community associated with them, the farm toun.  This was made up of married couples who lived in small cottages and single men who lived together in a bothy, or shelter. In order to entertain themselves and the other members of the toun, the young men of the bothy would hold musical evenings, the bothy nichts, with the music provided by their own impromptu band, the bothy band.  A good band might well become known outside the toun, and be in demand for local events such as dances.

See also
Bothy ballads
The Bothy Band

19th century in music
Scottish folk music